Un hombre solo is a Julio Iglesias album released in April 1987. It achieved worldwide success. The album was composed, arranged and produced by Manuel Alejandro. In 1988, it won the Grammy Award for Best Latin Pop Album.The album was released in LP, CD and Digipack format, with 2 editions: worldwide and Brazil.
He received platinum distinction in different countries like: Argentina (8×); Mexico, Colombia, Chile, Spain, Brazil (5×); Venezuela and Sony Discos (4×).

Track listing

Note: the label number is: 450908 2; the EAN number is: 5099745090822; the edition(standard) of this album is: worldwide; the format of this album is CD

Brasil edition 
 "O melhor de tua vida" – 4:03
 "Todo o amor que te faz falta" – 4:32
 "O que fazer?" – 4:03
 "Procure ser feliz" – 3:31
 "Que no se rompa la noche" – 4:26
 "América" – 4:27
 "Un hombre solo"-3:52
 "Intentando otra vez enamorarte" – 3:32
 "Doce superstar" – 3:18
 "Evadiéndome"– 3:50
 "El mar que llevo dentro" – 1:44

Charts

Weekly charts

All-time charts

Year-end charts

Certification

See also
List of number-one Billboard Latin Pop Albums from the 1980s
 List of best-selling Latin albums

References

1987 albums
Julio Iglesias albums
Grammy Award for Best Latin Pop Album
CBS Records albums
Albums produced by Manuel Alejandro